The Monument to Confederate war soldiers was an outdoor Confederate memorial located outside of the Tarrant County Courthouse in Fort Worth, Texas. The memorial was funded by the United Daughters of the Confederacy in 1953.

Inscription 
 In Memory of 
 Confederate Soldiers
 1861 - 1865
 And their Descendents
 Who Served in
 Spanish American War
 World War I
 World War II
 Erected By
 Julia Jackson Chapter
 United Daughters 
 Of The
 Confederacy

Removal 
During the George Floyd protests in June 2020, following the murder of George Floyd, a number of statues and memorials where toppled or removed. After residents defaced the monument the Tarrant County commission voted to remove it. The monument was removed on June 13, 2020, and moved to storage.

See also 
 List of Confederate monuments and memorials
 List of monuments and memorials removed during the George Floyd protests
 Removal of Confederate monuments and memorials

References 

1953 establishments in Texas
1953 sculptures
2020 disestablishments in Texas
Monuments and memorials in the United States removed during the George Floyd protests
Confederate States of America monuments and memorials in Texas
Outdoor sculptures in Texas
Removed Confederate States of America monuments and memorials
United Confederate Veterans
Vandalized works of art in Texas